Wakame most often refers to Undaria pinnatifida, an edible seaweed.

It may also refer to:
 Wakame Isono, the younger sister of Sazae Fuguta, the title character in the Sazae-san manga and anime series
 Kume no Wakame (?-781), a muraji and mother of Fujiwara no Momokawa, a statesman from the Nara period
 Wakame soup, also known as miyeok guk, a type of Korean soup made from the sea vegetable wakame
 Wakameshu, a Japanese liqueur made with wakame
 California wakame, or Alaria marginata, a species of the brown algae genus Alaria

See also 
 Wakamezake, a type of adult food play